Llanbadrig is a village and community (and former electoral ward) in Anglesey, Wales. The parish includes the township of Clygyrog, Tregynrig and the port of Cemaes (pronounced "Kem-ice"), and was formerly in the cwmwd of Talybolion.  The area has extensive quarries of limestone and marble.  At the 2001 census it had a population of 1,392, reducing slightly to 1,357 at the 2011 census.

The Welsh name Llanbadrig means "Church of Saint Patrick" and there is a Church of St. Patrick on the coast near Cemaes. It is said to have been founded in 440CE by St Patrick himself.  Local legend states that Patrick was shipwrecked on the small nearby island of Ynys Badrig (Patrick's Isle, also known as Middle Mouse),
which can be seen from the stile in the churchyard wall. The nearby cove is known as Porth Padrig.

Following the Isle of Anglesey (Electoral Arrangements) Order 2012 the Llanbadrig ward was amalgamated into a new multi-councillor ward, Twrcelyn.

Trivia
Portions of the 2006 movie Half Light starring Demi Moore were filmed in Llanbadrig, although the movie is ostensibly set in Scotland.

The headland was the location for a 'Peace Camp: coastal installation celebrating love poetry and landscape'. This was part of the Cultural Olympiad running alongside the 2012 London Olympic Games, and was one of eight such locations around Britain. For four nights in July, glowing dome tents and recitals of love poetry filled the headland.

Anglesey also has a Llyn Padrig (lake) and Rhosbadrig (farm) located inland from Aberffraw. Atlas Mon shows a medieval place called Tref Was Padrig (transl. "township of Patrick's servant") in that area.

The most northerly point of Wales, Ynys Badrig, is in the community.

Gallery

References

External links

 A Vision of Britain Through Time
 British Listed Buildings
 Genuki
 Geograph
 Office for National Statistics

 
Former wards of Anglesey